Dekeleia railway station (Sidirodromikos Stathmos Dekeleias) is a station on the Piraeus–Platy railway line in the northern part of the Athens urban area, in the municipality of Acharnes, Greece. It was inaugurated on 8 March 1904 and reopened on 6 May 2005. It is owned by OSE, but service are provided by Hellenic Train, through the Athens Suburban Railway from Athens to Chalcis. It is located close Tatoi Airport, however it does not serve the airport.

History
The Station opened on 8 March 1904 as Tatoi railway station in what was then the Central Greece on what was a branch line of the Piraeus, Demerli & Frontiers Railway. The station building is elaborate for such a small station (exceeding the traffic needs of the area serves); however, since it was formerly used to service the nearby Tatoi Palace, the summer residence of the Greek Royal Family from which the station receives its name. In 1920 the station and most of the standard gauge railways in Greece came under the control of the Hellenic State Railways (SEK). During the Axis occupation of Greece (1941–44), Athens was controlled by German military forces and the line used for the transport of troops and weapons. During the occupation (and especially during German withdrawal in 1944), the network was severely damaged by both the German army and Greek resistance groups. The track and rolling stock replacement took time following the civil war, with normal service levels resumed around 1948. In 1970 OSE became the legal successor to the SEK, taking over responsibilities for most of Greece's rail infrastructure. On 1 January 1971, the station and most of the Greek rail infrastructure was transferred to the Hellenic Railways Organisation S.A., a state-owned corporation. The line was converted to diesel sometime before 1990. Freight traffic declined sharply when the state-imposed monopoly of OSE for the transport of agricultural products and fertilisers ended in the early 1990s. Many small stations of the network with little passenger traffic were closed down.

In 2001 the infrastructure element of OSE was created, known as GAIAOSE; it would henceforth be responsible for the maintenance of stations, bridges and other elements of the network, as well as the leasing and the sale of railway assists. In 2003, OSE launched "Proastiakos SA", as a subsidiary to serve the operation of the suburban network in the urban complex of Athens during the 2004 Olympic Games. In 2005, TrainOSE was created as a brand within OSE to concentrate on rail services and passenger interface. In 2008, all Athens Suburban Railway services were transferred from OSE to TrainOSE.

The station was reopened on 6 May 2005. In 2009, with the Greek debt crisis unfolding OSE's Management was forced to reduce services across the network. Timetables were cutback and routes closed, as the government-run entity attempted to reduce overheads. In 2017 OSE's passenger transport sector was privatised as TrainOSE, currently, a wholly-owned subsidiary of Ferrovie dello Stato Italiane infrastructure, including stations, remained under the control of OSE. That same year on 30 July, Line 3 of the Athens Suburban Railway began serving the station. The Amnizia Railfan Club's Amnizia Railroad Club is housed within the station building.

Facilities
The ground-level station is assessed via stairs or a ramp. It has two side platforms, with the main station buildings located on the westbound platform; however inaccessible and rundown, with access to the platforms via stairs or lifts. The Station is housed in the original stone-built station buildings and is equipped with a booking office and waiting area. At platform level, both platforms have sheltered seating and Dot-matrix display departure and arrival screens and timetable poster boards. there is also a payphone located on the westbound platform. There is currently a small car park on-site. There is a bus stop outside the station where the local 537 call.

Services

Since 15 May 2022, the following weekday services call at this station:

Station layout

See also
Hellenic Railways Organization
TrainOSE
Proastiakos
P.A.Th.E./P.

References

External links
 Dekeleia railway station - National Railway Network Greek Travel Pages

Acharnes
Attica
Buildings and structures in Attica
Transport in Attica
Railway stations in Attica
Railway stations opened in 1904